No Census, No Feeling is a 1940 short subject directed by Del Lord starring American slapstick comedy team The Three Stooges (Moe Howard, Larry Fine and Curly Howard). It is the 50th entry in the series released by Columbia Pictures starring the comedians, who released 190 shorts for the studio between 1934 and 1959.

Plot
The Stooges are caught sleeping in a closed awning situated over a store. A brief argument among the trio results in Curly casually tossing a pot over his shoulder, breaking several dishes. The shopkeeper (Max Davidson), mad at the Stooges for vandalizing his store, calls the police and chases the Stooges, who quickly dash into a building’s revolving door. Upon exiting the building, the Stooges have clipboards in tow, having inadvertently landed jobs as census takers.

The boys work their way into the home of a socialite (Symona Boniface) who is concerned with a lack of participants in her weekly Bridge game. The Stooges happily comply, and join the game. In the interim, Curly begins to flirt with the socialite's maid, who is in the process of preparing a large bowl of punch. Curly finds that the drink is “not sweet enough” so, and ends up adding Alum salt to the mix, mistaking it for powdered sugar. Within minutes, everyone is mumbling their words as their lips become puckered.

Afterwards, the Stooges are still searching for people to interview for the census. They eventually come upon a nearby football game, and become thrilled as the prospect of speaking with everyone in the stadium. The trio don football players’ uniforms and bypass the guard in the guises of differing players and storm the field. They try asking questions to the players, who end up ignoring them, and Curly finds an ice cream vendor and takes off after him, somehow hijacking his wagon. The Stooges get pulled into the game and, after a few bouts of hardship, get an idea…if they would get the ball away from the players they would have no choice but to answer their questions. With that, Larry and Moe attach chains to the pants of two players and pull them off, distracting the players enough for Curly to grab the ball and run away. But the players notice him and give chase. Curly continues running like mad as Larry pulls the ice cream wagon, carrying Moe behind him. Moe throws fistfuls of ice cream at the players and the referee who are chasing them, and the Stooges run out of the stadium followed by the angry football team.

Production notes
No Census, No Feeling was filmed on May 25–29, 1940. The film title is a parody on the expression "No sense, no feeling".

Curly confuses "census" for "the censor", thinking he is working for Will H. Hays.

In one scene, Curly believes that it is Independence Day in October, claiming that "you never can tell; look what they did to Thanksgiving!". This is a reference to an event in 1939 when Franklin Roosevelt moved Thanksgiving to an earlier Thursday in November to lengthen the Christmas shopping season. This act angered many Republicans and, after some time, the holiday ended up moving to the fourth Thursday of November which just happens to be on the last Thursday of November most years. In 1940 and 1941, the holiday was on the third Thursday of November.

A colorized version of this film was released in the 2004 DVD collection entitled "Stooged & Confoosed."

References

External links 
 
 
No Census, No Feeling at threestooges.net

1940 films
The Three Stooges films
American black-and-white films
American football films
Films directed by Del Lord
1940 comedy films
Columbia Pictures short films
American slapstick comedy films
1940s English-language films
1940s American films